The Man Who Lost Himself is a 1941 American comedy film directed by Edward Ludwig and starring Brian Aherne, Kay Francis and Nils Asther. Aherne plays a man who encounters his exact double and is later mistaken for the other man who is now dead. The film is based on the novel of the same name by Henry De Vere Stacpoole. The novel was also previously adapted to film in 1920. The new version shifts the setting from London of the original to New York, although it features several British actors.

Plot
Department store mogul Malcolm Scott escapes from a mental institution. At a bar, he encounters lookalike John Evans and they get drunk together.

John wakes up in Malcolm's home, where butler Paul and others mistakenly believe him to be Malcolm. As he attempts to persuade them otherwise, the real Malcolm is killed in a subway accident. Malcolm's estranged wife Adrienne has been romantically involved with Peter Ransome, while it appears Malcolm had been seeing a Mrs. Van Avery while also embezzling from his store with a man named Mulhausen who now wants to buy it from Adrienne.

John foils the scheme, and when a grateful Adrienne finally realizes who he really is, she decides she would like to marry her dead husband's dead ringer.

Cast
 Brian Aherne as John Evans / Malcolm Scott
 Kay Francis as Adrienne Scott
 Henry Stephenson as Frederick Collins
 S. Z. Sakall as Paul
 Nils Asther as Peter Ransome
 Sig Ruman as Dr. Simms 
 Dorothy Tree as Mrs. Van Avery
 Janet Beecher as Mrs. Milford
 Marc Lawrence as Frank DeSoto
 Henry Kolker as Mulhausen
 Sarah Padden as Maid
 Eden Gray as Venetia Scott
 Selmer Jackson as Mr. Green
 William Gould as Mr. Ryan
 Russell Hicks as Mr. Van der Girt
 Frederick Burton as Mr. Milford
 Margaret Armstrong as Mrs. Van der Girt
 Wilson Benge as Butler

References

Bibliography
 Bubbeo, Daniel. The Women of Warner Brothers: The Lives and Careers of 15 Leading Ladies, with Filmographies for Each. McFarland, 2001.

External links
 
 

American black-and-white films
Films based on Irish novels
Films based on British novels
Films directed by Edward Ludwig
Films based on works by Henry De Vere Stacpoole
1941 comedy films
1941 films
American comedy films
Films scored by Hans J. Salter
Remakes of American films
Films set in New York City
1940s American films

Universal Pictures films